Bodil Cappelen (born April 26, 1930) is a Norwegian painter, textile artist, and book illustrator. She has also written children's books.

Early life
Cappelen was born in Stavanger, the daughter of Johan Munthe Cappelen from Oslo and Edith Heiberg from Leikanger. Her father was a judge and was known for his dissenting opinion in the acquittal of Police Chief Knut Rød after the Second World War. Bodil grew up with two sisters: Lotte Cappelen Thiis and Eli Heiberg. She attended the Norwegian National Academy of Craft and Art Industry from 1948 to 1951.

Life and work
Cappelen's first marriage was to the author and painter Finn Strømsted. The couple had two children, Aili Strømsted and Rune Cappelen Strømsted. From 1975 to 1994, Cappelen first lived with and then married the poet Olav H. Hauge in Ulvik in Hardanger. They were married on January 27, 1978. From 1977 to 1997 Cappelen was supported by a government guaranteed income for artists.

In the 1970s Cappelen had many solo exhibitions of tapestries, and between 1968 and 1982 she also participated many times in the Southern Norway Exhibition, the Western Norway Exhibition, and the Autumn Exhibition with tapestries.

After her last solo exhibition at the Artists' House gallery in 1981, Cappelen decided to illustrate children's books. She has illustrated five books for the Sami publisher Davvi Girji in Karasjok, with two of them featuring her own text. She also illustrated the book Norske barnerim og regler (Norwegian Children's Rhymes and Songs; Aschehoug 1984). In cooperation with Olav H. Hauge, she published the primer ABC, with editions appearing in 1986, 1987, 1995, and 2008.

In 1991, Cappelen had her first solo exhibition of oil paintings, at the Nota Bene Gallery in Oslo. Since then she has had many exhibitions of her paintings and she is still producing paintings. Since 1998, Cappelen has lived in Son.

Bodil Cappelen cites Eugène Delacroix's saying as her own motto: “The first merit of a painting is to be a feast for the eye.”

Cappelen is a member of the Norwegian Visual Artists Association (NBK) and the Association of Norwegian Painters (KNM). Cappelen's art has been purchased by the Bergen Art Gallery, the Norwegian Arts Council, and several public buildings.

Solo exhibitions
 1972: Young Artists Society, tapestry
 1981: Bergen Art Society, tapestry
 1981: Faorese Art Society, Faroe Islands, tapestry
 1981: Artists House, Oslo, tapestry
 1991: Nota Bene Gallery, Oslo, paintings
 1992: Kolibri Hallery, Haugesund, paintings
 1992: Hardanger Folk Museum, paintings
 1997: Hjadlane Gallery, Osa, paintings
 2000: Gallery X, Son, paintings
 2003: Næs Iron Works Museum, Ti malerier av ovnsplatemotiver fra 1600-tallet (Ten Paintings of Spark Screen Designs from the 1600s)
 2004: Moss Town and Industry Museum. Vintervarme. Fra jernverk til kunstverk (Winter Heat: From Iron Works to Artworks)
 2006: Tromsø Museum, 70 illustrations from Sami children's books

Awards 
2012: Anvil Award

Bibliography
 Pingvinen Po (Po the Penguin; also published in Lule Sami and Southern Sami), picture book (1993)
 Pinviidna Pu (1993)
 Modige Marja (Courageous Marja; also published in Lule Sami and Southern Sami), picture book (1994)
 Jálos Márjá (1994)
 Brev 1970–1975. Olav H. Hauge og Bodil Cappelen (Letters 1970–1975. Olav H. Hauge and Bodil Cappelen), biography and memoir (1996)

References

Further reading
 Østby, Leif, (ed.). 1983. Norsk kunstnerleksikon, 2. Oslo: Universitetsforlaget. .
 Haugen, Lambrecht. 2008. Cappelen-slekten 1627-2008. Rosendal.

External links
 Bodil Cappelen's homepage
 Samlaget.no About Bodil Cappelen.

1930 births
Living people
20th-century Norwegian women writers
20th-century Norwegian writers
20th-century Norwegian women artists
21st-century Norwegian women artists
21st-century Norwegian women writers
Norwegian women painters
Norwegian illustrators
People from Stavanger
People from Vestby
Bodil
Textile artists